Abercius and Helena are saints of the Catholic church. They are said to have been the children of Alphaeus the Apostle, although this has been challenged by some parties. Both of them are known to have been martyrs: Abercius by being exposed naked to bees, and Helena by stoning. They are commemorated with a feast day on May 20.

They are commemorated in the Orthodox Church on May 26.

See also
Saint Abercius, martyr, feast day 5 December
Abercius (martyr), feast day 28 February

References

Sources
 Holweck, F. G. A Biographical Dictionary of the Saints. St. Louis, MO: B. Herder Book Co., 1924.

1st-century Christian martyrs
1st-century Christian female saints
Year of birth unknown
Year of death unknown
Groups of Christian martyrs of the Roman era